Brightwell-cum-Sotwell is a twin-village and civil parish in the Upper Thames Valley in South Oxfordshire. It lies between Didcot to the west and the historic market town of Wallingford to the east. In 1974 it was transferred from Berkshire to the county of Oxfordshire, and from Wallingford Rural District to the district of South Oxfordshire.

History
Brightwell and Sotwell were originally two separate villages, rural settlements whose inhabitants worked the land.

Prehistory
For thousands of years hunter-gatherers of the Thames Valley would have passed this way, stalking wild animals and gathering from the trees that grew on the greens and in this area. This good soil and the abundant water supply may have encouraged Iron Age farmers (1500 BC - AD 50) to settle in this area. The ramparts on Wittenham Clumps provide enduring evidence of Iron Age settlement in the area. Then came the Romans, and there seems little doubt that the road from Dorchester to Silchester passed along what is now the Mere and Mackney Lane.

Medieval times
The first written evidence of a village here comes from the various Saxon charters describing ownership of land in Beorhtanville, Suttanwille and Maccanie.  In a charter of 854 Æthelwulf, King of Wessex granted Swithun, Bishop of Winchester, an estate of 30 hides at Brihtanwylle to help the bishop pay the expenses of entertaining distinguished foreign guests. Subsequently, William the Conqueror's agents recorded in the Domesday Book 70 families and two mills in Brightwell and Sotwell, but where these stood and how they were powered is unknown. Within 50 years of Domesday, Brightwell Castle was involved in the civil war between King Stephen and his cousin Matilda. The exact site of this castle is unknown, but it probably lay within the moated areas of what later contained St Agatha's/Brightwell manor house in Brightwell or Stonor Hayes manor house in Sotwell.

Early modern times

For the next 800 years Brightwell and Sotwell parishes only occasionally appear in recorded history. For example:
1330 (circa) Thomas de  Brayles, later Chancellor of the Irish Exchequer,  appointed  parish  priest.
1500 (circa) Prince Arthur (eldest son of Henry VII) stayed at Sotwell House.
1507 Clerk in Holy Orders murdered in St Agatha's.
1649 Edward Hyde DD ejected from his living for being a Royalist.
1666 Church collection for victims of the Great Fire of London.
1726 Mrs Frances Riggins leaves a legacy "for bread and ye schooling for ye poor of Slade End".
1774-1849 Reverend Thomas Wintle. "About 4 o'clock with my neighbours at ye Red Lion where they dined at the expense of ye parish and myself and then set again to mark the boundaries"
1781 King George III rode through the village returning from a stag hunt.
1785 A Sunday school set up by the Reverend Wintle.
1811 Inclosure Act for Brightwell.

With the coming of the Industrial Revolution and the Victorian era, the village had some significant philanthropists who worked hard for the good of the villagers:
Reverend Marmaduke Thompson - building of Brightwell National School in the village.
Reverend John Haldane Stewart - building of the new village school, which is now the village hall. Forming a night school for adult parishioners.
Farmer Edward Fairthorne - Reading Room and recreation ground for the villagers. Scholarships for promising boys to go to Wallingford Grammar School.
Miss Augusta Fairthorne - endowment of the Free Church.

Modern times
The War Memorial records the loss of villagers in the armed services in the two world wars. In the second half of the 20th century there was significant expansion of the villages and in 1948 the villages of Brightwell and Sotwell were brought together as one civil parish. In 1949 the Greenmere estate was built and later, estates were also built at Kings Orchard, Monks Mead and Datchet Green. There are no immediate plans for any major development, though around 2011 there was some controversy regarding a plan to build some 800 houses between the village and Wallingford. The plan to develop on this area was eventually abandoned, in the face of local pressure, in favour of a new development on the Hithercroft.

Notable buildings and structures
A walk around the narrow village streets will reveal many houses still standing which date back to Tudor times and beyond. The oldest building is probably Woodleys (Old Nursery Lane), with other examples such as Dobson's (Sotwell Street), The Old Priory (Little Lane), Middle Farm and Abbots House (both Church Lane - formerly Great Lane) and Smalls House (Mackney). Brightwell Manor is a Grade II listed building, with a mid 17th century half timbered structure extended by an 18th century stone frontage.   

The Church of England parish churches of St Agatha (Brightwell) and St James (Sotwell) would have been at the centre of village affairs, surrounded by many thatched cottages with cob, or wattle and daub, walls. The original building dates back to the 12th century, the tower was rebuilt in about 1797. The church was restored in the 19th century, with an organ chamber added in about 1903.

Notable residents
Thomas  de Brayles, judge and Crown  official,  was parish priest  here in the  1330s.
 George Warner Allen (1916–1988) - artist
Dr Edward Bach - Mount Vernon centre for education and information. The home and workplace of Bach in the last years of his life, where he completed his research into the Bach flower remedies.
Sir Francis Bernard, 1st Baronet - as governor of the provinces of New Jersey and Massachusetts Bay, his uncompromising policies were instrumental in the events leading to the American Revolution.
Charlie Brooker, the British comedy writer, grew up in Brightwell-cum-Sotwell.
Sir William Glock, Director of Music at the BBC and head of the Proms concerts, also lived in the village and died there in 2000.
William Ralph Inge, a Dean of St Paul's Cathedral in London lived in Brightwell Manor. His family continued to reside there until the early 1970s.

Gallery

References

Sources

External links

Royal Berkshire History: Brightwell-cum-Sotwell
Brightwell-cum-Sotwell Website
Dr Edward Bach Centre
Brightwell-cum-Sotwell Primary School
Brightwell cum Sotwell Community Led Parish Plan 2014 - 2024

Villages in Oxfordshire
Civil parishes in Oxfordshire